Ikuyo (written: 郁代) is a feminine Japanese given name. Notable people with the name include:

, Japanese volleyball player
, Japanese biathlete
, Japanese artist

Fictional characters
, a character in the video game Fate/Extra
, a character in the manga series Hanaukyo Maid Team
, a character in the manga series Bocchi the Rock!

Japanese feminine given names